The Flint Subdivision is a railway line in the state of Michigan. It is owned by the Canadian National Railway and runs from a junction with the Michigan Line and CN's South Bend Subdivision in Battle Creek, Michigan, to Port Huron, Michigan. At Port Huron, on the shores on Lake Huron, it connects with the Strathroy Subdivision which runs through the St. Clair Tunnel into Ontario. Historically, the line was part of the Grand Trunk Western Railroad mainline between Chicago and Toronto.

Today the line mostly handles freight. Amtrak's Blue Water uses the line between Battle Creek and Port Huron.

References

External links

Railway lines in the United States
Rail infrastructure in Michigan
Canadian National Railway lines